Glenn Thomas Edwards (June 14, 1931October 7, 2018) was an American historian. He taught at Whitman College from 1964 to 1998, and was named the William Kirkman Professor of History.

References

Whitman College faculty
1931 births
2018 deaths
Place of birth missing
Place of death missing
20th-century American historians
21st-century American historians